is a Shinto shrine located in Miyazaki, Miyazaki prefecture, Japan. It is dedicated to Izanagi.

Shinto shrines in Miyazaki Prefecture